The Squander Bug was a World War II propaganda character created by the British National Savings Committee to discourage wasteful spending and consumption. Originally designed by freelance illustrator Phillip Boydell for press adverts, the character was widely used by other wartime artists in poster campaigns and political cartoons. It is one of the few propaganda campaigns from World War II to be fully documented from the original concept sketches to the finished adverts.

Creation

During the Second World War, the British National Savings Committee became concerned that inflated prices were being paid for scarce consumer goods and believed that the money would be better spent on savings certificates to finance the war. The Committee felt that a way to ridicule indulgent spending was needed, without being boring or high-handed.

To meet this need, Boydell produced a series of six sketches depicting an imp-like creature named the 'Money Grub' that could 'push, pull, scratch, bite and steal'. The concept was accepted almost as it stood, aside from the name being changed.

The character was intended as a positive alternative to endless government warnings on what not to do, for example 'Don't waste fuel' or 'Don't waste paper'. Instead, the Squander Bug's speech balloons encouraged shoppers to waste their money on useless purchases, accompanied by captions urging consumers to fight or starve the creature. The character eventually gained swastika tattoos and was even placed in Madame Tussauds wax museum alongside other war enemies such as Hitler and Mussolini.

Usage
Boydell was mainly involved in developing the Squander Bug for press adverts, but the character was also adapted for use in poster campaigns with the same message. British wartime cartoonists such as David Low and Carl Giles also used the character, sometimes ironically. For example, Victor Weisz lampooned Hitler's manpower shortages by giving him his own pair of squander bugs.

The character developed an international reputation, and an adapted version was used in Australia, where the Squander Bug was given a Japanese appearance. A Squander Bug character was also created by Dr. Seuss to encourage Americans to buy war bonds, although the design was quite different from Boydell's version.

In media 
The Squander Bug is referenced in the 60s/70s sitcom about the Home Guard, Dad's Army, in the episode "Knights of Madness" (Series 9: Episode 3), with Private Pike (Ian Lavender) dressing up as the bug.

References

External links

 "Don't Let the Squander Bug Fool You"—Women's Magazines at Cyberheritage
 The War Years in Monkwearmouth by Sunderland Libraries. WW2 People's War at the BBC.

1940s in Australia
Economic history of the United Kingdom
Fictional demons and devils
Fictional insects
Military history of Australia during World War II
Propaganda cartoons
United Kingdom home front during World War II